Rotalia is an Estonian student corporation.

The corporation (Corps) was established on 10 November 1913 in Saint Petersburg. Since 1918 the corporation main activity took place in Tartu and Tallinn, Estonia. After the Soviet occupation of the country in 1944, the corporation continued its activities in exile. Chapters were established e.g. in Sweden, Australia, Canada and United States.

In 1988 the corporation's activity re-established in Tartu.

The corporation's motto is: "honesty, safety, self-consciousness and integrity".

References

External links

Student organizations in Estonia
Organizations established in 1913
1913 establishments in the Russian Empire